Eduardo Fontecilla (born 9 November 1929) is a Chilean long-distance runner. He competed in the marathon at the 1956 Summer Olympics.

References

External links
 

1929 births
Possibly living people
Athletes (track and field) at the 1955 Pan American Games
Athletes (track and field) at the 1956 Summer Olympics
Chilean male long-distance runners
Chilean male marathon runners
Olympic athletes of Chile
Place of birth missing (living people)
Pan American Games competitors for Chile